Michael Donald Lemon (born February 26, 1951) is a former National Football League linebacker who played from 1975 to 1977 for the New Orleans Saints, Denver Broncos and Tampa Bay Buccaneers. He attended Heelan High School before attending Ellsworth Community College and then the University of Kansas. He was drafted by the Saints in the 6th round, 149th overall, in the 1975 NFL Draft.

References

Living people
1951 births
New Orleans Saints players
Denver Broncos players
Tampa Bay Buccaneers players
Sportspeople from Topeka, Kansas
Players of American football from Kansas
American football linebackers
Ellsworth Panthers football players
Kansas Jayhawks football players